The 16th annual Miss Earth México pageant was held at Cancún on Quintana Roo. Thirty-two contestants of the Mexican Republic competed for the national title, which was won by Karol Rodríguez  from Tlaxcala who later competed in Miss Earth 2017 in TBA where she placed TBA. Karol Rodríguez crowned by outgoing Miss Earth México titleholder Itzel Astudillo.

Results

Miss Earth México

Special Awards
Miss Friendship:

 Guanajuato, Diana Guzmán 
Miss Photogeny:
 San Luis Potosí, Yuridia Vázquez 
Miss National Costume:
 Jalisco, Yolanda Monroy 
Miss Talent:
 Oaxaca, Iroshka Montes 
Miss Digital:
 Tamaulipas, Arlette Martínez 
Miss Direct Pass★:
 Zacatecas, Danna González

Expected Contestants

References

2017
2017 in Mexico
2017 beauty pageants